District Council elections were held in Shepway in 2007.

Results

By ward
'* denotes sitting Councillor.  Elected Councillors marked (E)

Elham Valley Division

Carol Crees had been elected as a Lib Dem in 2003 but defected to People First in 2004.  She sought re-election in Folkestone East ward.

Folkestone North East Division

Cllr Alan North had gained the seat for the Conservatives at a by-election in 2004.
Janet Andrews had been elected as a Lib Dem in 2003 but defected to People First in 2004.
Carol Crees has been elected as a Lib Dem in Elham and Stelling Minnis ward in 2003 but defected to People First in 2004.
Cllr Tony Dunning now sits as a Conservative.

Cllrs Paul Marsh and Brian Copping were both elected as Lib Dems in 2003 and defected to People First in 2004.

Folkestone South Division

Kim Culshaw had been elected as a Lib Dem in 2003 but defected to People First in 2004.
Cllrs Emily Sanger and Sue Wallace now sit as Conservatives.

Richard Green had been elected as a Lib Dem in 2003, before defecting to People First and then Greens 4 Shepway in 2004 and then standing down from the council.  He stood for election in Folkestone Park on the People First platform.
Cllr Philip Martin had gained the seat for the Conservatives in the ensuing by-election.

Folkestone West Division

Trevor Buss and Linda Cufley had been elected as a Lib Dem in 2003 but defected to People First in 2004.
Cllr Peter Gane now sits as a Conservative.

Tony Baker had been elected as a Liberal Democrat in 2003, but defected to Independent in 2004 and did not seek re-election.
Gary George had been elected as a Liberal Democrat in 2003, but defected to People First in 2004 and did not seek re-election.

Joy MacMillan had been elected as a Conservative but resigned the whip in 2006 and sought re-election as an Independent

Hythe Division

Wendy Harris had been elected as a Liberal Democrat but defected to the Green Party in 2004.  She did not seek re-election.

Romney Marsh Division

Terry Preston and Shirley Maile had defected from Lib Dem to People First in 2004.

References

2007 English local elections
2007
2000s in Kent